Ralph A. Oliver (July 31, 1886 – October 13, 1968) was a justice of the Iowa Supreme Court from December 14, 1938, to October 1, 1962, appointed from Woodbury County, Iowa.

References

External links

Justices of the Iowa Supreme Court
1886 births
1968 deaths
20th-century American judges